The men's 1500 metres events were held at the 2021 World Para Athletics European Championships in Bydgoszcz, Poland.

Medalists

See also
List of IPC world records in athletics

References

1500 metres
2021 in men's athletics
1500 metres at the World Para Athletics European Championships